Nilo Alcala is a Filipino-American composer and 2019 The American Prize Winner in Composition. He is the first Philippine-born composer to be commissioned by Grammy winner Los Angeles Master Chorale, and also to receive the Aaron Copland House Residency Award.

Biography
Alcala has received a number of recognitions, including the 2009 POLYPHONOS Young Composer Award given by the Seattle-based vocal ensemble, The Esoterics. He also received a Young Composer Award from the Asian Composers League, in cooperation with the Israel Composers' League in 2004. He won Best Movie Theme Song and was also nominated for Best Film Score at the 34th Metro Manila Film Festival for his music in the movie "Homecoming" by renowned Filipino director Gil Portes. For the same movie, Alcala also received nominations from the Golden Screen Awards of the Entertainment Press Society and the Star Awards for Movies of the Philippine Movie Press Club.

Alcala is the first ever Filipino to be commissioned by the Los Angeles Master Chorale.  His work Mangá Pakalagián was premiered at the Walt Disney Concert Hall on November 15, 2015.

As an arranger, his work in the Sony BMG released Album Acclamation of the renowned Philippine Madrigal Singers was nominated for Best Vocal Arrangement at the 20th Awit Awards organized by the Philippine Association of the Record Industry or PARI.

Alcala was member/soloist and resident composer/arranger of the two-time European Choral Grand Prix winner and UNESCO Artist for Peace Philippine Madrigal Singers. The group has premiered Alcala's compositions in prestigious international festivals and competitions, including the Florilege Vocal de Tours in France, and the European Grand Prix for Choral Singing in Arezzo, Italy.

His works "Diary of a Synaesthete" and "Speak to me my love/You are the evening cloud" were chosen for premiere by the Metro Manila Community Orchestra during the Music UnderKonstruction concerts at Cultural Center of the Philippines in 2005 and 2006, respectively.

His compositions and arrangements have been performed by various choirs around the world, including: The World Youth Choir, Asia Pacific Youth Choir, San Francisco Girls Chorus (San Francisco, CA), NOTUS (Indiana, IL), and Stellenbosch University choir (South Africa).

He was member and resident composer of Philippine Madrigal Singers. Also, he has been honorary member of the, Phi Beta Delta Honor Society for International Student, Phi Kappa Phi and Pi Kappa Lambda (music honor society).

Education 
Alcala graduated BS Development Communication from the University of the Philippines Los Baños (BSDC 1999) prior to his admission in 2001 to the University of the Philippines Diliman College of Music. Upon graduating Bachelor of Music in Composition Magna cum laude in 2007, Alcala received the Gawad Chanselor Natatanging Mag-aaral (Chancellor's Outstanding Student Award), an award conferred by University of the Philippines to students with outstanding academic and non-academic achievements. Alcala became full scholar under the Billy Joel Fellowship at Syracuse University College of Visual and Performing Arts in upstate New York where he finished Masters in Music Composition and received the Irene Crooker Excellence in Music Award in 2009.

He has won fellowships and grants including: Billy Joel Fellowship (Syracuse University), National Commission for Culture and the Arts (NCCA), and Asian Cultural Council.

Accomplishments

Awards/nominations

Selected works

Choral

Vocal

Orchestral

Chamber/solo instrumental

Musical theater

Film/animation

Discography

Commissions

References

External links 

Excerpts of compositions
Official Youtube Channel
Facebook page

1978 births
Living people
Music arrangers
Filipino film score composers
University of the Philippines Los Baños alumni
People from Lucena, Philippines
Musicians from Quezon
Syracuse University College of Visual and Performing Arts alumni
University of the Philippines Diliman alumni